Tuljaram Chaturchand College of Arts, Science and Commerce (T C College) is a college located in Baramati, Pune. The college was established in the 1962. The college campus is  40 acres large. The college offers Bachelors and master's degree in Arts, Commerce and Science. The college also offers bachelor's degree in vocational courses like Food Processing and Journalism & Mass Communication.

History

The college building got inaugurated on 23 June 1962 by Yashwantrao Chavan. Its name was ‘Baramati College’ and started with 120 students and 12 faculty members. On 21 June 1969, the college was renamed ‘Tuljaram Chaturchand College’.
Lt. S. T. Vanakudre was first principal of the college.

Activities 
A journal named 'Anekant' which deals with Humanities and Social Sciences is run by the college.

References

Universities and colleges in Pune
Colleges affiliated to Savitribai Phule Pune University